Kebyachevo (Käbäs; , Käbäç) is a rural locality (a village) and the administrative centre of Kebyachevsky Selsoviet, Aurgazinsky District, Bashkortostan, Russia. The population was 289 as of 2010. There are 8 streets.

Geography 
Kebyachevo is located 12 km south of Tolbazy (the district's administrative centre) by road. Utarkul and Tashlykul are the nearest rural localities.

References 

Rural localities in Aurgazinsky District